Christopher Blais (born 3 January 1981) is an off-road racing rider from Apple Valley, California.  Blais was the top American Rookie and 9th overall finisher of the 2005 race, 4th overall finisher in 2006, and 3rd overall of the 2007 Dakar Rally riding a KTM 690 Rally motorcycle.

Crash 
Blais was severely injured Sunday August 5, 2007 while pre-running for the Vegas to Reno race. He crashed off his bike and suffered a broken collarbone and, more severe, a crushed T-7 vertebra in his back. This injury has left him unable to walk and with very little feeling from the waist down.

Honors

References and external links 
 Chris Blais personal page
 Chris Blais online store
 Article by Dirt Rider on solo Baja 1000
 Chris Blais' brother Nick Blais racing site

1981 births
American motocross riders
Living people
People from Apple Valley, California